The 1978 NBA draft was the 32nd annual draft of the National Basketball Association (NBA). The draft was held on June 9, 1978, at the Plaza Hotel in New York City, New York, before the 1978–79 season. In this draft, 22 NBA teams took turns selecting amateur U.S. college basketball players and other eligible players, including international players. The first two picks in the draft belonged to the teams that finished last in each conference, with the order determined by a coin flip. The Indiana Pacers won the coin flip and were awarded the first overall pick, while the Kansas City Kings, who obtained the New Jersey Nets' first-round pick in a trade, were awarded the second pick. The Pacers then traded the first pick to the Portland Trail Blazers before the draft. The remaining first-round picks and the subsequent rounds were assigned to teams in reverse order of their win–loss record in the previous season. A player who had finished his four-year college eligibility was eligible for selection. If a player left college early, he would not be eligible for selection until his college class graduated. Before the draft, five college underclassmen were declared eligible for selection under the "hardship" rule. These players had applied and gave evidence of financial hardship to the league, which granted them the right to start earning their living by starting their professional careers earlier. Prior to the start of the season, the Buffalo Braves relocated to San Diego and became the San Diego Clippers. The draft consisted of 10 rounds comprising the selection of 202 players.

Draft selections and draftee career notes
Mychal Thompson from the University of Minnesota was selected first overall by the Portland Trail Blazers. Thompson, who was born in the Bahamas, became the first foreign-born player to be drafted first overall. Phil Ford from the University of North Carolina was selected second by the Kansas City Kings. He went on to win the Rookie of the Year Award and was also selected to the All-NBA Second Team in his rookie season. A college underclassman from Indiana State University, Larry Bird, was selected sixth by the Boston Celtics. However, he opted to return to Indiana State for his senior season before entering the league in 1979. He won the Rookie of the Year Award and was also selected to both the All-NBA First Team and the All Star Game in his rookie season. Bird spent his entire 13-year career with the Celtics and won three NBA championships. He also won three consecutive Most Valuable Player Awards and two Finals Most Valuable Player Awards. He was also selected to ten All-NBA Teams and thirteen consecutive All-Star Games. For his achievements, he has been inducted to the Basketball Hall of Fame. Bird was also named to the list of the 50 Greatest Players in NBA History announced at the league's 50th anniversary in 1996. After retiring as a player, Bird went on to have a coaching career. He coached the Indiana Pacers for three seasons, leading them to an NBA Finals appearance. He also won the Coach of the Year Award in 1998.

Before the draft, Larry Bird had just finished his junior year at Indiana State. However, he was eligible to be drafted without applying for "hardship" because his original college class at Indiana University had graduated. He initially enrolled at Indiana University in 1974 but dropped out before the season began. After sitting out a year, he enrolled at Indiana State. Despite being eligible for the draft, he stated that he would return to college for his senior season. His hometown team, the Indiana Pacers, initially held the first overall pick. However, when they failed to persuade him to leave college early, they traded the first pick to the Blazers, who also failed to convince him into signing. Five teams, including the Pacers who held the third pick, passed on Bird until the Celtics used the sixth pick to draft him. They drafted him even though they knew that they might lose the exclusive rights to him if he didn't sign before the next draft. He could reenter the draft in 1979 and sign with the other team that drafted him, and in negotiations with Red Auerbach Bird's agent Bob Woolf bluntly dismissed Red's lowball salary offers (he said that he would not offer Bird a contract that paid him more than the $400,000 annual salary of the team's highest-paid player at the time, Dave Cowens) and made it clear that Bird would enter the 1979 Draft without any regrets if Boston didn't change its plans. Nevertheless, in April 1979, he signed a five-year, US$3.25-million contract with the Celtics, which made him the highest-paid rookie in the history of team sport at that time.

Maurice Cheeks, the 36th pick, was selected to four All-Star Games and five consecutive All-Defensive Teams. After retiring as a player, he coached the Portland Trail Blazers and the Philadelphia 76ers for four and a half seasons each. He then coached the Detroit Pistons for the first portion of the 2013/14 NBA season but was fired before finishing his first season with the team. Micheal Ray Richardson, the fourth pick, Larry Bird, the sixth pick, Reggie Theus, the ninth pick, and Mike Mitchell, the fifteenth pick, are the only other players from this draft who were selected to an All-Star Game. Michael Cooper, the 60th pick, won the Defensive Player of the Year Award in 1987 and was selected to eight consecutive All-Defensive Teams. He spent his entire 12-year career with the Los Angeles Lakers and won five NBA championships. After retiring, he coached the Los Angeles Sparks of the Women's National Basketball Association (WNBA) for eight seasons, leading them to two consecutive WNBA championships in 2001 and 2002. Four other players drafted also went on to have coaching careers in the NBA: Reggie Theus, 21st pick Mike Evans, 53rd pick Randy Ayers and 55th pick Marc Iavaroni.

Key

Draft

Other picks
The following list includes other draft picks who have appeared in at least one NBA game.

Notable undrafted players
These players were not selected in the 1978 draft but played at least one game in the NBA.

Trades
 On June 8, 1978, the Portland Trail Blazers acquired the first pick from the Indiana Pacers in exchange for Johnny Davis and the third overall pick. Previously, the Blazers acquired a first-round pick on October 18, 1976, from the Buffalo Braves in exchange for Moses Malone. The Blazers used the pick to draft Mychal Thompson. The Pacers used the pick to draft Rick Robey.
 On September 10, 1976, the Kansas City Kings acquired Jim Eakins, Brian Taylor, 1977 and 1978 first-round picks from the New Jersey Nets in exchange for Nate Archibald. The Kings used the pick to draft Phil Ford.
 On June 8, 1978, the New York Knicks acquired the fourth pick and a 1979 first-round pick from the New Jersey Nets in exchange for Phil Jackson, the thirteenth pick and US$3.2-million settlement of their indemnification debt to the Knicks. Previously, the Nets acquired George E. Johnson, the pick and a 1979 first-round pick on September 1, 1977, from the Buffalo Braves in exchange for Nate Archibald. Previously, the Braves acquired the pick and a 1977 first-round pick on October 24, 1976, from the Houston Rockets in exchange for Moses Malone. The Knicks used the pick to draft Micheal Ray Richardson. The Nets used the pick to draft Winford Boynes.
 On September 14, 1977, the Golden State Warriors acquired a first-round pick and cash considerations from the Los Angeles Lakers. This trade was arranged as compensation when the Lakers signed Jamaal Wilkes on July 11, 1977. Previously, the Lakers acquired Ollie Johnson, the pick and a second-round pick on June 1, 1977, from the Kansas City Kings in exchange for Lucius Allen. The Warriors used the pick to draft Purvis Short. The Lakers used the pick to draft Ron Carter.
 On November 11, 1977, the Portland Trail Blazers acquired a 1978 first-round pick and a 1979 second-round pick from the Seattle SuperSonics in exchange for Wally Walker. Previously, the Sonics acquired the pick on September 25, 1975, from the Detroit Pistons in exchange for Archie Clark. The Blazers used the pick to draft Ron Brewer.
 On December 27, 1977, the Boston Celtics acquired Don Chaney, Kermit Washington and a first-round pick from the Los Angeles Lakers in exchange for Charlie Scott. On October 13, 1977, the Atlanta Hawks acquired a first-round pick from the New Orleans Jazz in exchange for Joe Meriweather. Previously, the Lakers acquired 1977, 1978 and 1979 first-round picks, and a 1980 second-round pick on August 5, 1976, from the Jazz in exchange for a 1978 first-round pick and a 1977 second-round pick. This trade was arranged as compensation when the Jazz signed Gail Goodrich on July 19, 1976. The Celtics used the pick to draft Freeman Williams. The Hawks used the pick to draft Jack Givens.
 On October 3, 1977, the New Orleans Jazz acquired a first-round pick from the Golden State Warriors as compensation for the signing of E. C. Coleman as a free agent. The Jazz used the pick to draft James Hardy.
 On January 13, 1977, the Milwaukee Bucks acquired Rowland Garrett, 1977 and 1978 first-round picks from the Cleveland Cavaliers in exchange for Elmore Smith and Gary Brokaw. The Bucks used the pick to draft George Johnson.
 On June 1, 1978, the Cleveland Cavaliers acquired the 15th pick from the Milwaukee Bucks in exchange for a 1979 first-round pick. The Cavaliers used the pick to draft Mike Mitchell.
 On the draft-day, the Denver Nuggets acquired the 17th pick from the Seattle SuperSonics in exchange for Tom LaGarde. The Nuggets used the pick to draft Rod Griffin.
 On October 11, 1977, the Washington Bullets acquired a first-round pick from the Denver Nuggets in exchange for Bo Ellis. The Bullets used the pick to draft Dave Corzine.
 On the draft-day, the Denver Nuggets acquired the 21st pick from the Philadelphia 76ers in exchange for a 1984 first-round pick. The Nuggets used the pick to draft Mike Evans.
 On June 7, 1978, the Golden State Warriors acquired the 22nd pick from the Portland Trail Blazers in exchange for a 1981 first-round pick. The Warriors used the pick to draft Raymond Townsend.

Early entrants

College underclassmen
The following college basketball players successfully applied for early draft entrance.

  Winford Boynes – G, San Francisco (junior)
  James Hardy – F, San Francisco (junior)
  James Holley – G, Schenectady County CC (sophomore)
  Frankie Sanders – F, Southern (junior)
  Reggie Theus – G, UNLV (junior)

Notes

See also
 List of first overall NBA draft picks

References
General

Specific

External links
NBA.com
NBA.com: NBA Draft History

Draft
National Basketball Association draft
NBA draft
NBA draft
1970s in Manhattan
Basketball in New York City
Sporting events in New York City
Sports in Manhattan